This article is the discography of British singer-songwriter Joan Armatrading.

Albums

Studio albums

Live albums

Compilations

Box sets

Extended plays

Singles

Other appearances

References 

Discographies of British artists
Pop music discographies
Rock music discographies